Tom McBeath is a Canadian actor. He is the winner of three Jessie Awards best known for playing Col. Harold Maybourne on Stargate SG-1. In 2017, he started playing Smithers on Riverdale.

Biography
He appeared in an episode of Street Justice and later, a second season episode and a fifth season episode of Highlander.  He is best known for playing Harry Maybourne on Stargate SG-1, a role for which he was nominated for a Gemini Award in 1998 and a Leo Award in 2005. He is also a stage actor known to take a diverse set of roles.

Selected filmography

 The Glitter Dome (1984, TV Movie) as Farrell
 Certain Fury (1985) as Policeman
 Love, Mary (1985, TV Movie) as Dr. Pearl
 Into Thin Air (1985, TV Movie) as Bank Account Manager
 Red Serge (1986, TV Series) as Constable Murphy
 Malone (1987) as 'Stringbean'
 Backfire (1988) as Man In Bar
 Christmas Comes to Willow Creek (1987, TV Movie) as Sergeant
 The Accused (1988) as Defendant Stu Holloway
 Cousins (1989) as Mr. Dionne
 Quarantine (1989) as Lieutenant Beck
 Sky High (1990, TV Movie) as Auctioneer
 Burning Bridges (1990, TV Movie) as Al
 Cadence (1990) as Principal
 Narrow Margin (1990) as Conductor #2
 Run (1991) as 'Smithy'
 My Son Johnny (1991, TV Movie) as Detective Morgan
 Yes Virginia, There is a Santa Claus (1991, TV Movie) as Sergeant Flynn
 Miles from Nowhere (1992, TV Movie) as Father Harney
 The Man Upstairs (1992, TV Movie) as Priest
 Relentless: Mind of a Killer (1993, TV Movie) as Edmond Price
 Without a Kiss Goodbye (1993, TV Movie)
 The Sea Wolf (1993, TV Movie) as Latimer
 Whose Child Is This? The War for Baby Jessica (1993, TV Movie) as John Monroe
 The X-Files (1993-1996  TV Series) as Dr. Lewton / Detective Gwynn / Scientist
 Timecop (1994) as T.E.C. Technician
 A Christmas Romance (1994, TV Movie) as Mr. Macklin
 Hideaway (1995) as Morton Redlow
 Deadlocked: Escape from Zone 14 (1995, TV Movie) as Senator Don Boyd
 She Stood Still: The Tailhook Scandal (1995, TV Movie) as Tailhook Spokesman
 Black Fox: Good Men and Bad (1995, TV Movie)
 The Omen (1995, TV Movie) as Felt Hat Man
 Ebbie (1995, TV Movie) as Van Munsen
 Trust in Me (1996) as Dutch Schultz
 The Limbic Region (1996, TV Movie) as Fredricks
 In Cold Blood (1996, TV Mini-Series) as Alfred Stoecklein
 Kitchen (1997) as Rick
 Final Descent (1997, TV Movie) as Pilot of Private Plane N9478C
 Tricks (1997, TV Movie) as Mike
 Dog's Best Friend (1997, TV Movie) as Bob Handel
 True Heart (1997) as Quint
 Firestorm (1998) as Loomis
 Goldrush: A Real Life Alaskan Adventure (1998)
 Nick Fury: Agent of Shield (1998, TV Movie) as Director General Jack Pincer
 Stargate SG-1 as Harry Maybourne (1998-2005)
 Atomic Train (1999, TV Mini-Series) as Hank
 A Murder on Shadow Mountain (1999, TV Movie) as District Attorney Arthur DiMarco
 Double Jeopardy (1999) as Coast Guard Officer
 In a Class of His Own (1999, TV Movie) as Skip Jordan
 Aftershock: Earthquake in New York (1999, TV Mini-Series) as George
 Skullduggery (2000, TV Series) as Muldoon
 They Nest (2000, TV Movie) as Eamon Wald
 High Noon (2000, TV Movie) as Rudy
 Along Came a Spider (2001) as Chief Cabell
 Off Season (2001, TV Movie) as Mel Breskin
 Sins of the Father (2002, TV Movie) as J. Edgar Hoover
 Cable Beach (2004, TV Movie) as John 'Luther' Croat
 Supervolcano (2005, TV Movie) as Michael Eldridge
 The Deal (2005) as Board Member #1
 Regarding Sarah (2006) as Obsessive Lawyer
 Eight Days to Live (2006, TV Movie) as Expert
 My Baby is Missing (2007, TV Movie) as Don Walters
 Luna: Spirit of the Whale (2007, TV Movie) as Ernie Ivers
 The Bad Son (2007, TV Movie) as Mark Petrocelli
 Enemy Within (2007, TV Movie) as Sheriff Gene
 Beneath (2007) as Mr. Wells
 Aliens vs. Predator: Requiem (2007) as Karl
 Alien Trespass (2009) as Wilson
 Watchmen (2009) as News Analyst
 Living Out Loud (2009, TV Movie) as Ultrasound Technician
 Christmas in Canaan (2009, TV Movie) as Carl
 The Search for Santa Paws (2010) as Cabbie
 Recoil (2011) as Sheriff Cole
 Gaku (2012, TV Movie) as Moss
 The Woodcarver (2012) as Principal Stark
 The Philadelphia Experiment (2012, TV Movie) as Broadmore
 Camera Shy (2012) as Detective Oslo
 Down River (2013) as Bob
 No Men Beyond This Point (2015) as Jim
 Patterson's Wager (2015) as Dr. Collins
 Travelers (2016, TV Series) as Ellis
 Prodigals (2017) as Judge
 Riverdale (2017-2019, TV Series) as Smithers
 Time for Me to Come Home for Christmas (2018, TV film) as Henry Roamer
 A Godwink Christmas: Meant for Love (2019, TV film) as Charlie
 A Million Little Things (2020, TV series) as Flannel Shirt Man

References

External links

Living people
Canadian male stage actors
Canadian male television actors
Male actors from Vancouver
1958 births